Chrostosoma patricia is a moth of the subfamily Arctiinae. it was described by William Schaus in 1912. It is found in Costa Rica.

References

Biodiversity Heritage Library

Chrostosoma
Moths described in 1912